Imma protocrossa is a moth in the family Immidae. It was described by Edward Meyrick in 1909. It is found in Bolivia.

The forewings are dark fuscous, slightly sprinkled with whitish ochreous and with an irregular cloudy pale greyish-ochreous streak along the termen, tending to be interrupted into spots, leaving the terminal edge dark fuscous. The hindwings are rather dark fuscous.

References

Moths described in 1909
Immidae
Moths of South America
Taxa named by Edward Meyrick